Barry Mitterhoff is a musician who plays mandolin. He is a former member of Skyline, Silk City, Bottle Hill, and Hot Tuna. Played with Peter Rowan, Tex Logan and Lamar Greer in The Green Grass Gringos.

Mitterhoff is also known as a film score producer, contributing to film soundtracks, including You've Got Mail.  He worked on the soundtrack for O Brother, Where Art Thou?, but his work was not included in the released version.

References

American mandolinists
Living people
Hot Tuna members
1952 births
American bluegrass mandolinists
Flying Fish Records artists